Thomas Østvold (born 18 October 1973) is a retired Norwegian football defender.

He played for Lyn entire senior career, which he albeit ended at age 26. Of his 111 league games, 18 came in the Eliteserien in the seasons 1992, 1993 and 1997. He was capped on youth level for Norway and was a squad member at the 1993 FIFA World Youth Championship.

References

1973 births
Living people
Norwegian footballers
Norway youth international footballers
Footballers from Oslo
Lyn Fotball players
Eliteserien players
Norwegian First Division players
Association football defenders